Ophiusa indistincta is a moth of the family Erebidae first described by Frederic Moore in 1882. It is found in India and Indonesia.

References

Erebidae
Ophiusa
Moths of Asia
Moths of Indonesia
Moths described in 1882